Best of KMD is a compilation album by KMD, featuring tracks from the albums Mr. Hood and Black Bastards.

Track listing
 "Mr. Hood Meets Onyx/Subroc's Mission"
 "Who Me?"
 "Trial & Error"
 "Hard Wit No Hoe"
 "Mr. Hood Gets A Haircut"
 "808 Man"
 "Humrush"
 "Nitty Gritty" (featuring Brand Nubian)
 "Peachfuzz"
 "Preacher Porkchop"
 "Garbage Day 3"
 "What A Niggy Know?"
 "Sweet Premium Wine"
 "Smokin' That S**t"
 "Contact Blitt"
 "Gimme"
 "Black Bastards"
 "It Sounded Like A Roc"
 "Plumskinzz (Oh No I Don't Believe It!)"
 "Popcorn"
 "Nitty Gritty (Remix)" (featuring Lord Jamar, Sadat X & Busta Rhymes)

References

MF Doom albums
Hip hop compilation albums
2003 greatest hits albums
Nature Sounds compilation albums